Diego de la Vega (born  1 June 1979 in Buenos Aires, Argentina) is an Argentinean retired footballer who is last known to have played for Club Union Pigüé in his home country.

Norway

Turning out for Bryne of the Norwegian Premier League in 2002 despite work permit problems early on, de la Vega left Argentina mainly because of the economic imbroglios happening there, making his debut in a 7-0 cup triumph over third division Vedavåg and involved in three goals. Not extending his visa in 2003, the Argentinean left Bryne that June.

References

External links 
 at Footballdatabase.eu
 at Soccerway

1979 births
Living people
Argentine footballers
Association football defenders
Argentine expatriate footballers
Expatriate footballers in Norway
Argentinos Juniors footballers
Club Atlético Los Andes footballers
Bryne FK players
San Telmo footballers
Eliteserien players
Footballers from Buenos Aires